The 2001 Amsterdam Admirals season was the seventh season for the franchise in the NFL Europe League (NFLEL). The team was led by head coach Bart Andrus in his first year, and played its home games at Amsterdam ArenA in Amsterdam, Netherlands. They finished the regular season in fifth place with a record of four wins and six losses.

Offseason

Free agent draft

Personnel

Staff

Roster

Schedule

Standings

Game summaries

Week 1: at Rhein Fire

Notes

References

Amsterdam
Amsterdam Admirals seasons